Daniel Blanco Acevedo (1879 Montevideo – 1971) was a Uruguayan lawyer and political figure.

Background

A member of the Uruguayan Colorado Party, Daniel Blanco Acevedo's father Juan Carlos Blanco Fernández was a Foreign Minister and Deputy in the 19th Century. His son Juan Carlos Blanco Estradé was himself to be Foreign Minister in the 1970s. His brother Juan Carlos Blanco Acevedo was Foreign Minister in the 1920s.

Political offices

He was Minister of Finance from 1927 to 1929. He served as a Deputy for Montevideo in the 1940s and 1950s.

He was appointed Deputy Speaker of the Uruguayan Chamber of Deputies in 1951.

See also

 Politics of Uruguay
 List of political families

References

1879 births
1971 deaths
Politicians from Montevideo
Uruguayan people of Spanish descent
Colorado Party (Uruguay) politicians
Ministers of Economics and Finance of Uruguay
Members of the Chamber of Representatives of Uruguay (1947–1951)
Members of the Chamber of Representatives of Uruguay (1951–1955)
20th-century Uruguayan lawyers
University of the Republic (Uruguay) alumni